The 2012 Big West Conference men's basketball tournament took place March 8–10, 2012 at the Honda Center in Anaheim, California. The Tournament was previously held at the Anaheim Convention Center. Long Beach State won the tournament, which allowed them to receive the conference's automatic bid to the 2012 NCAA Men's Division I Basketball Tournament.  Cal State Northridge was banned from competing in postseason play for failing to meet the NCAA's Academic Progress Rate requirements.

Format
Eight teams qualified for the 2012 Big West tournament. In the semifinals the highest seed will play the lowest seed, while the remaining two teams match up.

Bracket

References

Big West Conference men's basketball tournament
2011–12 Big West Conference men's basketball season
Big West Conference men's basketball tournament
Big West Conference men's basketball tournament